Anuppur Assembly constituency is one of the 230 Vidhan Sabha (Legislative Assembly) constituencies of Madhya Pradesh state in central India. It is a segment of Shahdol (Lok Sabha constituency).

Members of Legislative Assembly

 2013 : Ramlal Rautel, Bharatiya Janata Party   
 2018 : Bisahulal Singh, Indian National Congress

References

Assembly constituencies of Madhya Pradesh
Anuppur district